HMS Sarpedon was an  destroyer which served with the Royal Navy. The R class were a development of the preceding , but differed in having geared turbines and other design changes. Launched in June 1916, the vessel escorted convoys that sailed between Scotland and Scandinavia in the First World War. After the war, the ship was allocated to local defence at Nore. However, in 1923, the Navy decided to retire many of the older vessels and Sarpedon was retired and was sold to be broken up on 23 June 1926.

Design and development

Sarpedon was one of eighteen  destroyers ordered by the British Admiralty in March 1916 as part of the Sixth War Construction Programme. The R class were a development of the preceding , but differed in having geared turbines to improve fuel consumption, the central gun mounted on a bandstand and minor changes to improve seakeeping.

Three funnels were fitted.

Armament consisted of three QF 4in Mk IV guns on the ship's centreline, with one on the forecastle, one aft on a raised platform and one between the second and third funnels. A single 2-pounder (40 mm) pom-pom anti-aircraft gun was carried, while torpedo armament consisted of two twin mounts for  torpedoes. The ship had a complement of 82 officers and ratings.

Construction and career

Sarpedon was laid down by Hawthorn Leslie and Company in Hebburn on 27 September 1915, launched on 1 June 1916 and completed on 2 September. On commissioning, the ship joined the 11th Destroyer Flotilla of the Grand Fleet.

The destroyer was assigned to escort convoys between Britain and Scandinavia. On 19 July 1917, Sarpedon and the destroyer  were escorting an east-bound convoy on the route from Lerwick to Norway when they came under attack by the German submarine . The Danish steamer  was sunk and the submarine escaped unseen and unscathed. Later that year, on 21 October, the destroyer was escorting a west-bound convoy from Bergen, when sister ship  fatally crippled fellow escort  in an accidental collision.

After the war, the ship was allocated to the local defence flotilla at Nore. in 1923, the Navy decided to scrap many of the older destroyers in preparation for the introduction of newer and larger vessels. Sarpedon was decommissioned and sold to Alloa Shipbreaking Company to be scrapped on 23 July 1926. Initially taken to Rosyth to be demolished on 6 November, the hulk was transferred to Charlestown to be broken up on 7 December.

Pennant numbers

References

Citations

Bibliography

 
 
 
 

 
 
 
 

1916 ships
R-class destroyers (1916)
Ships built on the River Tyne
World War I destroyers of the United Kingdom